Saili is a 2019 Nepali drama film, directed by Ram Babu Gurung. The film stars Dayahang Rai, Gaurav Pahari, Menuka Pradhan, Buddhi Tamang, Maotse Gurung. It is about labour migration of Nepalese youths.

Cast 

 Dayahang Rai
 Gaurav Pahari
 Menuka Pradhan
 Buddhi Tamang
 Maotse Gurung

Reception 
Diwakar Pyakurel of OnlineKhabar found the film to be "realistic humane story". Abhimanyu Dixit of The Kathmandu Post wrote "At a time when Nepali films are as dismal as they are, Saili stands out. It presents a dose of reality that will please an audience fed up with glossier fares that provide little substance. Saili has substance, but it also has shortcomings that should be looked upon as opportunities for future filmmakers, especially writer-director Ram Babu Gurung". The Annapurna Express praised the film writing "Saili is exactly what cinema should be: a piece of art".

References

External links

Nepalese romantic comedy films
Cultural depictions of Nepalese women